The Chinese character  may refer to:

 Yunnan, whose Chinese provincial abbreviation is 
 Dianchi Lake, the source of Yunnan's abbreviation